The Peace of Basel of 1795 consists of three peace treaties involving France during the French Revolution (represented by François de Barthélemy).

The first was with Prussia (represented by Karl August von Hardenberg) on 5 April;
The second was with Spain (represented by Domingo d'Yriarte) on 22 July, ending the War of the Pyrenees; and
The third was with the Landgraviate of Hesse-Kassel (represented by Friedrich Sigismund Waitz von Eschen) on 28 August, concluding the stage of the French Revolutionary Wars against the First Coalition.

With great diplomatic cunning, the treaties enabled France to placate and divide its enemies of the First Coalition, one by one. Thereafter, Revolutionary France emerged as a major European power.

The first treaty, on 5 April 1795 between France and Prussia, had been under discussion since 1794. Prussia withdrew from the coalition that had been working on the impending partition of Poland and, when it was appropriate, withdrew its troops aligned against Austria and Russia. (See also the French Revolutionary Wars and the Napoleonic Wars.) In secret, Prussia recognised the French control of the west bank of the Rhine pending a cession by the Imperial Diet. France returned all of the lands east of the Rhine captured during the war. On the night of 6 April, the document was signed by the representatives of France and Prussia: François de Barthélemy and Karl August von Hardenberg. They were not face to face, each was in his own accommodation in Rosshof or the Markgräflerhof, and the papers were passed around by a courier. The treaty that ceded the left bank of the Rhine was in a secret article, along with the promise that of indemnifying the right bank if the left bank of the Rhine was covered in a final general peace in France. Peter Ochs drew up the treaty and served as a mediator for a significant proportion of these financial statements.

Prussia stuck to the agreement of the Treaty of Basel until 1806, when it joined the Fourth Coalition.

In the second treaty, on 22 July, Spain ceded the eastern two thirds of the island of Hispaniola to France in exchange for keeping Gipuzkoa. The French also came at night to sign the peace treaty between France and Spain in which Spain was represented by Domingo d'Yriarte, who signed the treaty in the mansion of Ochs, the Holsteinerhof.

These treaties with Prussia and Spain had the effect of breaking the alliance between the French Republic's two main opponents of the First Coalition.

On 28 August 1795, the third treaty was completed, a peace between France and the Landgraviate of Hesse-Kassel, signed by Friedrich Sigismund Waitz von Eschen.

There was also an agreement to exchange the Austrian troops who had been captured in Belgium.

See also
Campaigns of 1795 in the French Revolutionary Wars
Cisrhenian Republic
List of treaties

Notes

References

Further reading
 Hargreaves-Mawdsley, W. N. "Conclusive Peace-Treaty between His Catholic Majesty and the French Republic, signed at Basel 1795." in Spain under the Bourbons, 1700–1833 (Palgrave Macmillan, London, 1968) pp. 175–176.

External links 

Basel
1795 in France
1795 in Spain
1795 in Prussia
1795 in North America
Basel
Basel
Basel
Basel
Basel
Basel
Basel
France–Spain relations
Basel
History of Haiti
Saint-Domingue